Turkey participates in the 2021 Islamic Solidarity Games held in Konya, Turkey from 9 to 18 August 2022, the Games were rescheduled from 20 to 29 August 2021, the event was postponed to be held from 10 to 19 September 2021 in July 2020 by the ISSF because the original dates were coinciding with the 2020 Summer Olympics, which were postponed due to the COVID-19 pandemic. In May 2021, the ISSF postponed the event to August 2022 citing the COVID-19 pandemic situation in the participating countries.

Medalists

Archery

Recurve

Compound

Athletics

Men
Track & road events

Field events

Women
Track & road events

Field events

Basketball

Men's 3x3 tournament
Group C

Women's 3x3 tournament
Group C

Quarterfinal

Semifinal

Bronze medal match

Football 

Summary

Group A

Semifinal

Gold medal match

Gymnastics 

Artistic Gymnastics

Aerobic Gymnastics

Judo

Men

Women

Karate

Men

Women

Handball

Summary

Men's tournament
Team roster

Group B

Semifinal

Final

Women's tournament
Team roster

Group A

Semifinal

Final

Taekwondo

Men kyourugi

Women kyourugi

Volleyball 

Summary

Men's tournament
Pool B

|}

Semifinal

|}

Bronze medal match

|}

Women's tournament
Pool A

|}

Semifinal

|}

Final

|}

Weightlifting

Men

Women

Wrestling 

Men's freestyle

Men's Greco-Roman

Women's freestyle

Nordic Format

Group stage Format

References

Nations at the 2021 Islamic Solidarity Games
2021
Islamic Solidarity Games